Keith Eric Gudsell (19 October 1924 – 7 July 2007) was a New Zealand rugby union footballer who played for both the country of his birth and Australia. He was a member of the New Zealand national side, the All Blacks, on their 1949 tour of South Africa, appearing in six matches but no internationals. Having graduated with a Bachelor of Agricultural Science from Massey Agricultural College in 1949, Gudsell then studied veterinary science at the University of Sydney, graduating in 1954. During this time he played three tests for Australia against the touring All Blacks in 1951.

References

1924 births
2007 deaths
Rugby union players from Whanganui
Massey University alumni
University of Sydney alumni
New Zealand rugby union players
New Zealand international rugby union players
Manawatu rugby union players
Wanganui rugby union players
New South Wales Waratahs players
Australia international rugby union players
Waikato rugby union players
Rugby union centres